Bereton Montessori Nursery and Primary School is a private, mixed-sex education school in Rivers State, Nigeria. The school has campuses in Old GRA and Stadium Road in Port Harcourt. As its name suggests, the school consists of a nursery and primary school approved by the Rivers State government.

Background
Bereton Montessori was founded by Dale's daughter, Victoria Diete Spiff. The school opened on 10 September 1978 as a nursery school. At its inception, the school had about 120 pupils in eight classrooms. It was upgraded with a primary school in January 1983.

Bereton Montessori is affiliated with Charles Dale Memorial International School.

Notable alumni

Agbani Darego - model and fashion designer
Burna Boy - singer, rapper and Grammy Award winner

See also
List of schools in Port Harcourt
Charles Dale Memorial International School

References

External links

Schools in Port Harcourt
Educational institutions established in 1978
Primary schools in Rivers State
1978 establishments in Nigeria
1970s establishments in Rivers State
Old GRA, Port Harcourt
Montessori schools